Warwasi is a  Paleolithic rockshelter site located at north of Kermanshah in western Iran. It was excavated by Bruce Howe under direction of late Robert Braidwood in the 1960s. This site contains a rich archaeological sequence from Middle Paleolithic to late Epipaleolithic.

References

Braidwood, R. J. (1960) Seeking the World's First Farmers in Persian Kurdistan: A Full-Scale Investigation of Prehistoric Sites Near Kermanshah. The Illustrated London News  no. 237, pp. 695–97.
Dibble, H.L., & S.J. Holdaway (1993).  The Middle Paleolithic Industries of Warwasi. In The Paleolithic Prehistory of the Zagros-Taurus, edited by D.I. Olszewsky and H.L. Dibble, pp. 75–99. Philadelphia: University Museum Symposium Series, Volume 5, University of Pennsylvania.
Olszewski, D.I.  (1993). The Late Baradostian Occupation at Warawsi Rockshelter, Iran. In The Paleolithic Prehistory of the Zagros-Taurus, edited by D.I. Olszewsky and H.L. Dibble, pp. 187–206. Philadelphia: University Museum Symposium Series, Volume 5, University of Pennsylvania.
Olszewski, D.I. (1993). The Zarzian Occupation at Warwasi Rockshelter, Iran. In The Paleolithic Prehistory of the Zagros-Taurus, edited by D.I. Olszewsky and H.L. Dibble, pp. 207–236. Philadelphia: University Museum Symposium Series, Volume 5, University of Pennsylvania.
Shidrang, S. (2018). The Middle to Upper Paleolithic transition in the Zagros: the appearance and evolution of the Baradostian. In The Middle and Upper Paleolithic Archeology of the Levant and Beyond (pp. 133-156). Springer, Singapore.

External links
 Paleolithic hominin remains from Eshkaft-e Gavi (southern Zagros Mountains, Iran): description, affinities, and evidence for butchery

1960s archaeological discoveries
Archaeological sites in Iran
Buildings and structures in Kermanshah Province
Former populated places in Iran
Rock shelters
Prehistoric Iran
Epipalaeolithic
Paleolithic sites